Awakening is the third studio album by Canadian recording artist Promise Shepherd, it was released on June 28, 2011.The album features guest appearances from The World Famous Tony Williams, Jhené Aiko, J. Ivy and others. The album was released by Duck Down Music.

Track listing

Personnel
 Executive producer: Promise Shepherd
 Recording engineer/vocal producer: Promise
 Mixing: Promise, Tariq Adi
 Mastering: Proof Of Purchase Mixing, Burlington
 Art Direction, Design and Photography: RMe, MsUnderstood Photography
 Additional Vocals: O'Sound, Regular Robb, Josh Record, Grier Munro, Liya, Brendan Philip, Omar "Oh!" Lunan, Yonatan Watts, Duane Forrest, J. Ivy, Luke Weaver

Awards
 2012 CGMA Covenant Award for Hip-Hop/Rap Album of the Year
 2013 Glass Awards Nominee for Hip-Hop/Rap Album of the Year

References

2011 albums
Promise (rapper) albums